"Mirror" is a single released by Gackt on February 9, 2000 under Nippon Crown. It peaked at ninth place on the Oricon weekly chart and charted for six weeks.

Track listing (Gackt's version)

References

2000 singles
Gackt songs
Songs written by Gackt
2000 songs